The landing at Mindelo was a landing of Portuguese Liberal forces near Mindelo (Vila do Conde) North of Porto on 8 July 1832, and turning point in the Liberal Wars (1828 - 1834).

The landing  
During the first 4 years of the War, Absolutist forces loyal to Dom Miguel, who had usurped the throne of Portugal, were in control of the Portuguese mainland. While the Liberals loyal to ex-Emperor of Brazil, Dom Pedro Duke of Braganza, controlled the Azores.

On 8 July 1832 a fleet of 60 ships under the command of the British Admiral George Rose Sartorius arrived from the Azores at the Arnosa de Pampelido beach near Mindelo.
Some 7500 men came ashore, including António Severin de Noronha Count of Vila Flor, Alexandre Herculano, Almeida Garrett, Joaquim António de Aguiar and José Travassos Valdez. There were also many foreign volunteers : French, Belgian, Polish, Italian, German, Spanish and a British contingent under the command of Colonels George Lloyd Hodges and Charles Shaw. The Army was later called Os Bravos do Mindelo (The Braves of Mindelo). 

The Absolutist authorities were caught by surprise and were not able to oppose the landing, nor the occupation of Porto the next day. On 23 July the Liberal Army were able to repulse the Absolutists in the Battle of Ponte Ferreira, but had to fall back on Porto where they were besieged for an entire year.

Honours
The port city on the island of São Vicente in Cape Verde was named Mindelo in 1838 in honour of the Landing at Mindelo.

Sources 
 Disembarkation Braves of Mindelo 1832
 180.º Aniversário do Desembarque do Mindelo

References

Mindelo
1832 in Portugal
Mindelo
July 1832 events
Conflicts in 1832